Faroe–Soviet Friendship Association (Danish: Færøsk-Sovjetisk Venskabsforening), was a pro-USSR organization in the Faroe Islands founded in 1979, as a section of Landsforeningen Danmark-Sovjetunionen (National Association Denmark-Soviet Union). The chairman of the association was Andreas S. Højgaard. The association arranged cultural exchanges and study trips to the Soviet Union.

Organizations based in the Faroe Islands
Soviet Union friendship associations